The Kleiner Solstein is a mountain,  high, in the  Nordkette in the  Karwendel Alps in the Austrian state of Tyrol. Despite its name ("Small Solstein") it towers above its western neighbour, the Großer Solstein ("Great Solstein") by almost  and is thus the highest summit in the Nordkette. The southern side of the Kleiner Solstein facing the Inn valley is characterised by schrofen and steep-sided cirques.

Ascent 
The normal route to the Kleiner Solstein runs from the saddle between the Großer and Kleiner Solstein, initially crossing a small ridge of rock (Felsrippe) then over schrofen from the south to the flat summit ridge following a waymarked route to the top. The route to the saddle between the two peaks may be reached either from the Solsteinhaus and the Großer Solstein or on two paths from the south from the Neue Magdeburger Hut.

The crossing from the Hohe Warte to the east from the Gamswart Saddle has a climbing grade of UIAA III- and runs directly along the initially extremely sharp eastern arête. There are several difficult climbing routes up the north face.

Literature

References

External links 
 
 Tour description

Two-thousanders of Austria
Karwendel
Mountains of Tyrol (state)
Mountains of the Alps
Innsbruck